Liverton is a village in the borough of Redcar and Cleveland and the ceremonial county of North Yorkshire, England.

Liverton Village is named in the doomsday book and was previously named Liureton, it is a rural village that has by-enlarge retained its heritage as a farming community and in 1978 became protected by a conservation order. In 2011 an Area Appraisal was performed.

The village is surrounded by a field system with Station Road B1366 running through the middle. The village can date its roots back to the 12th century, with evidence of this seen from the font, arch and doorway of St Michaels church. There is further evidence of a medieval settlement in area.

It is located 140 meters above sea level and is located on the edge of the North Yorkshire Moors.

Properties

The village primarily consists of farm land and cottages, with a moorland church, village hall and local inn. The village lies within the boundary of a conservation area and includes many Listed Buildings, most of which date back to the 18th century.

Listed Buildings

Within the village are many historic structures, most of which are constructed from local sandstone blocks with a herringbone finish. Below are some of the listed buildings:
 Parish Church of St Michaels  - dating back to the 12th century, List Entry Number 1139676 
 Church House Farm
 Tickhill House Farm, Middle House and Haygate Cottage (Formally Tickhill Cottage) - dating back to 1720, List Entry Number 1136629 
Shrubberies Cottage and Farm - dating back to 1800, list Entry Number 1139678

Church

The church was built in the 12th century, with evidence of this seen from the font, arch and doorway. Alterations over the years have kept the church in good state and retained the original structure. The church was restored at the beginning of the 20th century and the plaster was removed from the Chancel arch, the arch can still be seen today.

Village Hall

The village hall was previously owned by Lord Downe, as were many of the local farms and land. This building was converted from a school into a village hall and in now run by a village committee.

Local Inn

There is a village Inn called The Waterwheel Inn. Located on the edge of the village, the pub reopened in 1962 and is a traditional building with beams on show and built from sandstone.

Statistics

Statistics about Redcar & Cleveland from the Office for National Statistics Census 2001 
https://web.archive.org/web/20110902105910/http://www.redcar-cleveland.gov.uk/ - Borough Council website 
BBC Tees

History
Liverton Village was named in the doomsday book and previously went by the name of Liureton.

In 1870–72, John Marius Wilson's Imperial Gazetteer of England and Wales described Liverton like this:

References

External links

Villages in North Yorkshire
Places in the Tees Valley
Loftus, North Yorkshire